Mikhail Merabiyevich Gorelishvili (born 29 May 1993) is a Russian football player of Georgian ethnic origin. He plays for Leningradets.

Club career
He made his Russian Professional Football League debut for FC Tosno on 19 April 2014 in a game against FC Sever Murmansk. He made his Russian Football National League debut for Tosno on 6 July 2014 in a game against FC Gazovik Orenburg.

References

External links
 
 
 

1993 births
Sportspeople from Nizhny Novgorod
Russian people of Georgian descent
Living people
Russian footballers
Association football midfielders
FC Rubin Kazan players
FC Dila Gori players
FC Tosno players
FC Mika players
FC Dinamo Batumi players
FC Metalurgi Rustavi players
FC Samtredia players
Erovnuli Liga players
Armenian Premier League players
Russian expatriate footballers
Expatriate footballers in Georgia (country)
Expatriate footballers in Armenia
FC Nizhny Novgorod (2015) players
FC Chertanovo Moscow players
FC Amkar Perm players
FC Volga Ulyanovsk players
FC Leningradets Leningrad Oblast players